NGC 3175 is a spiral galaxy located in the far eastern part of the southern constellation of Antlia at an approximate distance of 54 million light-years. NGC 3175 was discovered on March 30, 1835 by English astronomer John Herschel, whose notes described it as, "considerably bright, large, much extended NE-SW, very gradually little brighter middle". This galaxy is the namesake of the NGC 3175 group of galaxies, which includes the spiral galaxy NGC 3137.

The morphological classification of this galaxy is SAB(s)b, which indicates a weakly-barred spiral galaxy (SAB) with no inner ring structure (s), and somewhat tightly wound spiral arms (b). The plane of the galaxy is inclined at an angle of 77° to the line of sight from the Earth, and thus is being viewed close to edge on.

This is an indication that no star formation is occurring, which is peculiar for a spiral galaxy. In contrast, the central region is undergoing star formation and contains  of neutral hydrogen. There are no nearby galaxies that could explain the stripping of hydrogen gas from the outer part of the galaxy.

See also
 Spiral galaxy

References

External links
NGC 3175 on SIMBAD

3175
Spiral galaxies
Antlia
029892